Ypthima is a species rich genus of Old World butterflies in the family Nymphalidae.

Species
The genus includes the following species:

 Ypthima affectata
 Ypthima akbar
 Ypthima albida
 Ypthima albipuncta
 Ypthima ancus
 Ypthima antennata
 Ypthima aphnius
 Ypthima arctoa
 Ypthima asterope
 Ypthima atra
 Ypthima avanta
 Ypthima baileyi
 Ypthima baldus
 Ypthima beautei
 Ypthima bolanica
 Ypthima cantlei
 Ypthima cerealis
 Ypthima ceylonica
 Ypthima chenui
 Ypthima chinensis
 Ypthima ciris
 Ypthima condamini
 Ypthima confusa
 Ypthima congoana
 Ypthima conjuncta
 Ypthima daclaca
 Ypthima dengae
 Ypthima diplommata
 Ypthima dohertyi
 Ypthima doleta
 Ypthima esakii
 Ypthima evansi
 Ypthima fasciata
 Ypthima frontierii
 Ypthima fulvida
 Ypthima gavalisi
 Ypthima granulosa
 Ypthima hanburyi
 Ypthima hannyngtoni
 Ypthima horsfieldii
 Ypthima huebneri
 Ypthima hyagriva
 Ypthima iarba
 Ypthima imitans
 Ypthima impura
 Ypthima indecora
 Ypthima inica
 Ypthima insolita
 Ypthima iris
 Ypthima jacksoni
 Ypthima junkoae
 Ypthima kalelonda
 Ypthima lamto
 Ypthima lihongxingi
 Ypthima lisandra
 Ypthima loryma
 Ypthima lycus
 Ypthima masakii
 Ypthima megalomma
 Ypthima methora
 Ypthima methorina
 Ypthima microphthalma
 Ypthima motscholskyi
 Ypthima multistriata
 Ypthima muotuoensis
 Ypthima nareda
 Ypthima nebulosa
 Ypthima newara
 Ypthima nigricans
 Ypthima nikaea
 Ypthima norma
 Ypthima nynias
 Ypthima pandocus
 Ypthima parasakra
 Ypthima pemakoi
 Ypthima perfecta
 Ypthima persimilis
 Ypthima philomela
 Ypthima praenubila
 Ypthima praestans
 Ypthima pseudodromon
 Ypthima pulchra
 Ypthima pupillaris
 Ypthima putamdui
 Ypthima recta
 Ypthima rhodesiana
 Ypthima risompae
 Ypthima riukiuana
 Ypthima sakra
 Ypthima sarcaposa
 Ypthima savara
 Ypthima sensilis
 Ypthima sesara
 Ypthima similis
 Ypthima simplicia
 Ypthima singala
 Ypthima singorensis
 Ypthima sinica
 Ypthima sobrina
 Ypthima sordida
 Ypthima stellera
 Ypthima striata
 Ypthima tappana
 Ypthima tiani
 Ypthima vuattouxi
 Ypthima watsoni
 Ypthima yangjiahei
 Ypthima yatta
 Ypthima yayeyamana
 Ypthima yoshinobui
 Ypthima ypthimoides
 Ypthima yunosukei
 Ypthima zyzzomacula

References

External links

 Ypthima at the Tree of Life Web Project
 Seitz, A. Die Gross-Schmetterlinge der Erde 13: Die Afrikanischen Tagfalter. Plate XIII 29

 
Satyrini
Nymphalidae genera
Taxa named by Jacob Hübner